Noordoostpolder Airport was a small airport located near Emmeloord, Netherlands. The airport was named after the Noordoostpolder in which it was located. It was used primarily by gliders and cropduster flights.

The airport was closed to make room for a residential area.

References

Defunct airports in the Netherlands
Airports in Flevoland
Noordoostpolder